Elżbieta Żebrowska ( Bednarek, 27 March 1945 – 23 December 2021) was a Polish athlete who competed mainly in the 80 metres hurdles. Born in Warsaw, she was a gold medallist at the 1966 European Championships in Budapest in the 4 × 100 metres relay with Danuta Straszyńska, Irena Kirszenstein and Ewa Kłobukowska, and won the bronze medal in the 80 metres hurdles. She finished seventh in the final of the 80 metres hurdles at the 1968 Summer Olympics in Mexico City in 10.6 seconds. Żebrowska died on 23 December 2021, at the age of 76.

References

External links
 

1945 births
2021 deaths
Athletes from Warsaw
Polish female hurdlers
Polish female sprinters
Polish female athletes
Athletes (track and field) at the 1968 Summer Olympics
Olympic athletes of Poland
European Athletics Championships medalists